Laurent Bateau is a French actor. He has appeared in more than eighty films since 1992.

Selected filmography

References

External links
 

Living people
French male film actors
French male television actors
Year of birth missing (living people)
20th-century French male actors
21st-century French male actors
Place of birth missing (living people)